Lyn Sprules (born 11 September 1975) is a female retired hammer thrower from England.

Athletics career
Her personal best throw is 63.96 metres, achieved in August 2000 in Bedford. This places her fourth on the British outdoor all-time list, behind Lorraine Shaw, Shirley Webb and Zoe Derham.

She represented England in the hammer throw event, at the 1998 Commonwealth Games in Kuala Lumpur, Malaysia.

International competitions

References

1975 births
Living people
British female hammer throwers
English female hammer throwers
Commonwealth Games competitors for England
Athletes (track and field) at the 1998 Commonwealth Games